Worlds of Tomorrow was an American science fiction magazine published from 1963 to 1967, at which point it was merged into If. The first issue appeared in April 1963. The last issue was published in May 1967. The publishers were Barmaray Co, New York City, and then Galaxy Publishing. It briefly resumed publication from Summer 1970 to Spring 1971, producing three issues. The magazine was edited in its first period of publication by Frederik Pohl, who was editor of Galaxy Publishing Co. from 1960-1969, and by Ejler Jakobsson in the second. It has published fiction by such noted authors as Arthur C. Clarke, Larry Niven, Fritz Leiber, Philip K. Dick, Brian W. Aldiss, Jack Williamson and Philip José Farmer. Pohl stated in 1967 that the magazine showed a loss of $15,000 during its first incarnation.

References

External links

 
Defunct science fiction magazines published in the United States
Magazines established in 1963
Magazines disestablished in 1967
Magazines published in New York City
Science fiction magazines established in the 1960s